is a town located in Fukushima Prefecture, Japan. ,  the town had an estimated population of 15,158 in 6,575 households, and a population density of 17 persons per km².

Geography
Minamiaizu is located in the mountainous southern portion of the Aizu region of Fukushima Prefecture, bordered Tochigi Prefecture to the south.

Mountains : Onsabi Mountains, Nasudake, Mount Nanatsugadake
Rivers : Okawa, Ina River

Neighboring municipalities
Fukushima Prefecture
 Shimogō
 Hinoemata
 Tadami
 Shōwa
Tochigi Prefecture
 Nasushiobara
 Nikkō

Climate
Minamiaizu has a Humid continental climate (Köppen Dfa) characterized by warm summers and cold winters with heavy snowfall.  The average annual temperature in Minamiaizu is 8.8 °C. The average annual rainfall is 1642 mm with September as the wettest month. The temperatures are highest on average in August, at around 24.8 °C, and lowest in January, at around -3.4 °C.

Demographics
Per Japanese census data, the population of Minamiaizu peaked I the 1950s and has declined steadily over the past 60 years. It is now less than it was a century ago.

History
The area of present-day Minamiaizu was part of ancient Mutsu Province and formed part of the holdings of Aizu Domain during the Edo period. After the Meiji Restoration, it was organized as part of Minamiaizu District in Fukushima Prefecture. With the establishment of the modern municipalities system on April 1, 1889, the town of  Tajima and the villages of Ina, Nangō, and Tateiwa were established with the creation of the modern municipalities system. These four municipalities merged on March 20, 2006 to form the town of  Minamiaizu.

Economy
The economy of Minamiaizu is primarily agricultural. Rice, tomatoes and asparagus are the main crops.

Education
The town has seven public elementary schools and four public junior high school operated by the town government. The town has two public high schools operated by the Fukushima Prefectural Board of Education.
Fukushima Prefectural Tajima High School
 Fukushima Prefectural Minamiaizu High School

Transportation

Railway
 Aizu Railway – Aizu Line
  -  -  -  -  -  -  - 
 Yagan Railway – Aizu Kinugawa Line

Highway

Local attractions

Aizu-Tajima Gionsai festival
Okuaizu Museum
Komado Wetlands
Tashiroyama Wetlands
Yunohana Onsen
Hosoi Residence Museum
Maezawa Magariya Village (Museum of "L" Shaped Old Folk Houses)

Noted people from Minamiaizu
Kozo Watanabe, politician

References

External links
 
Official Website 

Towns in Fukushima Prefecture
Minamiaizu, Fukushima